Rigmor Aasrud (born 26 June 1960) is a Norwegian politician for the Labour Party.

She served in the position of deputy representative to the Norwegian Parliament from Oppland during the terms 1993–1997, 1997–2001 and 2001–2005. When the second cabinet Stoltenberg assumed office following the 2005 elections, Aasrud was appointed State Secretary in the Ministry of Health and Care Services. On 20 October 2009, Aasrud was appointed Minister of Government Administration and Church Affairs.

From 1995 to 2005 Aasrud was mayor of Gran municipality. She had previously been a member of the municipality council from 1983 to 1991.

A day before Jonas Gahr Støre assumed office as prime minister following the 2021 election, Aasrud was elected the next parliamentary leader succeeding Støre, at a party group meeting. Terje Aasland was elected her deputy.

References

Regjeringen.no biography 

1960 births
Living people
Deputy members of the Storting
Labour Party (Norway) politicians
Norwegian state secretaries
Mayors of places in Oppland
BI Norwegian Business School alumni
Lillehammer University College alumni
Women mayors of places in Norway
20th-century Norwegian women politicians
20th-century Norwegian politicians
21st-century Norwegian politicians
21st-century Norwegian women politicians
Women members of the Storting
Norwegian women state secretaries